Olof Henrik Dagård (born 7 August 1969 in Halmstad) is a retired Swedish decathlete.

Achievements

Personal bests
100 metres - 10.58 (1989)
400 metres - 46.71 (1994)
1500 metres - 4:34.46 (1990)
110 metres hurdles - 13.97 (1994)
High jump - 2.07 (1989)
Pole vault - 5.10 (2000)
Long jump - 7.48 (1989)
Shot put - 15.45 (1993)
Discus throw - 45.64 (1994)
Javelin throw - 69.26 (1993)
Decathlon - 8403 (1994)

External links

1969 births
Living people
Swedish decathletes
Athletes (track and field) at the 2000 Summer Olympics
Olympic athletes of Sweden
Sportspeople from Halmstad
European Athletics Championships medalists
Sportspeople from Halland County